Phase 4 Films was a Canadian film distribution company based in Toronto. It had two branches in the United States: Los Angeles, California and Fort Mill, South Carolina. Its subsidiary kaboom! Entertainment markets children's entertainment.

History
Phase 4 Films traces its history to Telegenic, a family-oriented film distributor founded in 1996. Berry Meyerowitz purchased Telegenic in 2000 and renamed it Kaboom! Entertainment. In 2006, Peace Arch Entertainment Group, which later merged with ContentFilm, purchased Kaboom!. Berry Meyerowtiz founded Phase 4 Films in April 2009 when he bought back their North American distribution business. In 2011, Phase 4 announced a new Canadian television venture alongside Take 5 Development. In 2012, they partnered with Kevin Smith's SModcast Pictures to distribute those films in the United States and Canada. 
In 2014, Phase 4 acquired ESI Distribution and signed distribution deals with The Criterion Collection and Shout! Factory. On June 2, 2014, Phase 4 Films was acquired by Entertainment One.

Trademark infringement lawsuit
In 2013, Phase 4 picked up the Canadian animated feature The Legend of Sarila for distribution in the United States, renaming the film Frozen Land and drastically changing the logo to mimic that of Disney's Frozen. In late December 2013, Disney filed a trademark infringement lawsuit against Phase 4 in California federal court, seeking an injunction against the continued distribution of Frozen Land in the United States.  Disney alleged that less than three weeks prior to the release of its animated feature film Frozen, Phase 4 Films theatrically released The Legend of Sarila, which garnered "minimal box office revenues and received no significant attention." To trade off the success of Disney's animated film and "[t]o enhance the commercial success of Sarila, the defendant redesigned the artwork, packaging, logo, and other promotional materials for its newly (and intentionally misleadingly) retitled film to mimic those used by [Disney] for Frozen and related merchandise." While film titles cannot be trademarked by law, Disney cited a number of alleged similarities between the new Phase 4's Frozen Land logo and Disney's original one. By late January 2014, the two companies had settled the case; the settlement stated that the distribution and promotion of The Legend of Sarila and related merchandise must use its original title and Phase 4 must not use trademarks, logos or other designs confusingly similar to Disney's animated release. Phase 4 was also required to pay Disney $100,000 before 27 January 2014, and make "all practicable efforts" to remove copies of Frozen Land from stores and online distributors before 3 March 2014.

Filmography

References

External links
Phase 4 Films Inc. page
kaboom! Entertainment Inc. page

Entertainment One
Film distributors of Canada
Film distributors of the United States
Defunct film and television production companies of the United States
Defunct film and television production companies of Canada
Mass media companies disestablished in 2016
Companies established in 1996
2014 mergers and acquisitions